Elaine Howard Ecklund is the Herbert S. Autrey Chair in Social Sciences and Professor of Sociology in the Rice University Department of Sociology, director of the Boniuk Institute for Religious Tolerance at Rice, and a Rice scholar at the James A. Baker III Institute for Public Policy. She is also a faculty affiliate in the Rice Department of Religion. Ecklund received a B.S. in human development and an M.A. and Ph.D. in sociology from Cornell University. Her research focuses on institutional change in the areas of religion, immigration, science, medicine, and gender. She has authored numerous research articles, as well as five books with Oxford University Press, a book with New York University Press, and a book with Brazos Press. Her latest book is Varieties of Atheism in Science (Oxford University Press, 2021) with author David R. Johnson.

Science vs. Religion: What Scientists Really Think
Ecklund's 2010 book, Science vs. Religion: What Scientists Really Think, is a systematic study of what scientists actually think and feel about religion. In the course of her research, Ecklund surveyed nearly 1,700 scientists and interviewed 275 of them. Ecklund concluded that "Much of what we believe about the faith lives of elite scientists is wrong. The 'insurmountable hostility' between science and religion is a caricature, a thought-cliche, perhaps useful as a satire on groupthink, but hardly representative of reality."

In her book she mentions her most recent finding that at least 50% of scientists consider themselves to have religious traditions. Some of Ecklund's other findings about scientists' self descriptions:
 34% were atheist (12% of which also call themselves spiritual), 30% were agnostic, 27% had some belief in God (9% have doubts but affirm their belief, 5% have occasional belief, 8% believe in a higher power that is not a personal God), and 9% of scientists said they had no doubt of God's existence. While more atheistic than the rest of the U.S. population, the research demonstrates that about a third (36%) of these scientists maintain some belief in God, a considerably smaller proportion than the approximately 90% in the general American population.
 Most scientists who expressed some belief in God considered themselves "religious liberals".
 Some atheist scientists still considered themselves "spiritual".
 Religious scientists reported that their religious beliefs affected the way they think about the moral implications of their work, not the way they practice science.

Ecklund says that scientists who believe in God may live "closeted lives" to avoid discrimination. Others are, what she calls, "spiritual entrepreneurs", seeking creative ways to work with the tensions between science and faith outside the constraints of traditional religion. The book centers on portraits of 10 representative men and women working in the natural and social sciences at top American research universities. Ecklund reveals how scientists—believers and skeptics alike—struggle to engage the religious students in their classrooms. She argues that many are searching for "boundary pioneers" to cross the picket lines separating science and religion and overcome the "conflict thesis".

Criticism
Jason Rosenhouse, an associate professor of mathematics at James Madison University, is critical of some of Ecklund's research summaries. In particular, he contests her claim that "As we journey from the personal to the public religious lives of scientists, we will meet the nearly 50 percent of elite scientists like Margaret who are religious in a traditional sense" (page 6, Ecklund, 2010). Rosenhouse says that "religious in a traditional sense" is never clearly defined. He suggests that she may be referring to her finding that 47% of scientists affiliate themselves with some religion, but says that calling them "religious in a traditional sense" is therefore misleading, because only 27% of scientists have any belief in a God, even though many more than that associate with religious cultures.

Other work
In 2006, Ecklund published Korean American Evangelicals: New Models for Civic Life, an examination of the civic narratives, practices, and identities of second-generation Korean-American evangelicals. The book looks at how Korean Americans use religion to negotiate civic responsibility, as well as to create racial and ethnic identity. The work compares the views and activities of second generation Korean Americans in two different congregational settings, one ethnically Korean and the other multi-ethnic, and includes more than 100 in-depth interviews with Korean American members of these and seven other churches around the country. It also draws extensively on the secondary literature on immigrant religion, American civic life, and Korean American religion. The book was reviewed in several academic journals.

Ecklund's completed research projects include the Religion among Academic Scientists (RAAS) study; the Religion, Immigration, Civic Engagement (RICE) study; the Perceptions of Women in Academic Science (PWAS) study; the Religious Understandings of Science (RUS) study; the Ethics among Scientists in International Context (EASIC) study; the Religion among Scientists in International Context (RASIC) study; the Religion, Inequality, and Science Education (RISE) study; and research on religion and medicine.

Ecklund's research project, Religion among Scientists in International Context (RASIC), is the largest cross-national study of religion and spirituality among scientists. The project was funded by a multimillion-dollar grant from the Templeton World Charity Foundation. The study began with a survey of biologists and physicists at different points in their careers at top universities and research institutes in France, Hong Kong, India, Italy, Taiwan, Turkey, the United Kingdom, and the United States—national contexts that have very different approaches to the relationship between religious and state institutions, different levels of religiosity, and different commitments to scientific infrastructure—and was followed by qualitative interviews. The study surveyed 22,525 scientists, and 9,422 scientists responded to the survey; the study included qualitative interviews with 609 of these scientists. In 2016 Ecklund, along with co-authors, published "Religion among Scientists in International Context: A New Study of Scientists in Eight Regions" in the journal Socius: Sociological Research for a Dynamic World.

Funded by a grant from the National Science Foundation, the Ethics among Scientists in International Context (EASIC) study explored how scientists understand ethical issues in relation to science, with particular attention to the ways scientists' perspectives on religion may or may not influence their ethical perspectives. To that end, researchers interviewed 211 physicists in China, the United Kingdom, and the United States about how they approach ethical issues associated with research integrity and the effects of industry financing.

Ecklund has published over 100 articles in peer-reviewed social scientific, medical, and other journals.  With an interest in translating academic research to a broader public, she has written blogs and essays for The Scientist, The Chronicle of Higher Education, the Social Science Research Council, Science and Religion Today, The Washington Post, USA Today, the Huffington Post and the Houston Chronicle.

Religion and Public Life Program
Ecklund served as the director of the Religion and Public Life Program (RPLP) at Rice University from 2010 to 2022. The mission of the RPLP is to conduct top-notch research, train scholars, and engage local, national, and global communities by offering programs that advance dialogue about religion in the public sphere. The RPLP brings together scholars who study religion, religious leaders from different traditions, and students and community members from a variety of backgrounds and with diverse religious perspectives. The RPLP facilitates conversations about religion not only within the academy, but between the academy and the broader public.  The RPLP was launched in 2010 as part of the Social Sciences Research Institute at Rice University.

Influence
Ecklund's work has been covered in The Economist, Time, BBC, the Huffington Post,Yahoo! News, Scientific American, USA Today, Inside Higher Ed, The Chronicle of Higher Education, Nature, Discover, The Washington Times, Institute of Physics, Science & Theology News, Newsweek, The Washington Post, CNN, MSNBC, Chicago Public Radio, Houston Public Radio, Xinhua News, and other outlets.

Books
Ecklund, Elaine Howard, and David R. Johnson (2021). Varieties of Atheism in Science. New York, NY: Oxford University Press. .
Ecklund, Elaine Howard (2020). Why Science and Faith Need Each Other: Eight Shared Values That Move Us beyond Fear. Grand Rapids, MI: Brazos Press. .
Ecklund, Elaine Howard, David R. Johnson, Brandon Vaidyanathan, Kirstin R. W. Matthews, Steven W. Lewis, Robert A. Thomson, Jr., and Di Di (2019). Secularity and Science: What Scientists Around the World Really Think About Religion. New York: Oxford University Press. .
Ecklund, Elaine Howard, and Christopher P. Scheitle (2017). Religion vs. Science: What Religious People Really Think. New York: Oxford University Press. .
Ecklund, Elaine Howard, and Anne E. Lincoln (2016). Failing Families, Failing Science: Work-Family Conflict in Academic Science. New York: New York University Press. .

See also
 Relationship between religion and science

References

External links
 
 Ecklund's faculty listing, Rice University Department of Sociology
 Ecklund's faculty affiliate listing, Rice University Department of Religion
 Ecklund's profile at the James A. Baker III Institute for Public Policy
 Religion and Public Life Program website

Year of birth missing (living people)
Living people
American sociologists
American women sociologists
Cornell University alumni
Rice University faculty
21st-century American women
Presidents of the Society for the Scientific Study of Religion